The Rodovia Luiz de Queirós (official designation SP-304) is a highway in the state of São Paulo, Brazil.

SP-304 interconnects the cities of Americana, by the Anhanguera Highway (SP-330) and Piracicaba, serving also the city of Santa Bárbara d'Oeste, at which level crosses with the Rodovia dos Bandeirantes (SP-348).

It has been named in honour of Luís Vicente de Sousa Queirós, a farmer and agriculturist who founded in Piracicaba the first practical school of agriculture in the state, which later became a college of the University of São Paulo.

See also
Highway system of São Paulo
Brazilian Highway System

References

Highways in São Paulo (state)